Leandro Julián Garate (born 2 September 1993) is an Argentine professional footballer who plays as a centre-forward for Unión Española.

Career
Garate was a part of River Plate's youth system, notably playing for the U20s at the 2012 U-20 Copa Libertadores in Peru; which the club won. Garate began playing for Tigre in the 2013–14 Argentine Primera División season, making his senior debut on 18 November 2013 during a 2–1 win over Newell's Old Boys. In the following 2014 campaign, Garate scored goals against Godoy Cruz and Lanús as Tigre qualified for the 2015 Copa Sudamericana. In August 2016, Garate joined 1. divisjon side Sandefjord. He departed five months later having not featured, though he was an unused substitute for a fixture with Bryne.

2017 saw Garate switch Norway for Argentina as he agreed to sign for Deportivo Rincón of Torneo Federal B. Eight goals in twenty fixtures followed. Primera B Nacional's Brown completed the signing of Garate in January 2018. His first appearance arrived on 3 February versus Deportivo Morón, which preceded his first goal for them a week later against Atlético de Rafaela. Garate was loaned to Arsenal de Sarandí in January 2019. He scored five goals in twelve matches for them, including the winning strike in the championship play-off against Sarmiento; which secured Arsenal promotion and the title.

July 2019 saw Garate leave Arsenal, and subsequently Brown, to move to Chile with Barnechea of Primera B. He scored twice on his first home start against Deportes Copiapó on 16 August, which preceded a goal against San Luis and a brace versus Rangers across eleven appearances in his first five months. On 2021 season, he joined club Coquimbo Unido.

Career statistics
.

Honours
River Plate
U-20 Copa Libertadores: 2012

Arsenal de Sarandí
Primera B Nacional: 2018–19

Coquimbo Unido
 Primera B de Chile: 2021

References

External links

1993 births
Living people
People from Constitución Department
Sportspeople from Santa Fe Province
Argentine footballers
Association football forwards
Argentine expatriate footballers
Expatriate footballers in Norway
Expatriate footballers in Chile
Argentine expatriate sportspeople in Norway
Argentine expatriate sportspeople in Chile
Argentine Primera División players
Primera Nacional players
Norwegian First Division players
Primera B de Chile players
Chilean Primera División players
Club Atlético Tigre footballers
Sandefjord Fotball players
Club Atlético Brown footballers
Arsenal de Sarandí footballers
A.C. Barnechea footballers
Coquimbo Unido footballers
Unión Española footballers